Kim Ekdahl du Rietz (born 23 July 1989) is a Swedish retired handball player.

Career
He competed for the Swedish national team at the 2012 Summer Olympics in London where they won a silver medal. In January 2017 he announced his retirement following the conclusion of the 2016–2017 Bundesliga season.

In 2018, Ekdahl Du Rietz returned to his former club Rhein-Neckar Löwen, signing a three-month contract to help the club – currently suffering from several injuries on important players – out. Ekdahl Du Rietz also decided to give away all the money earned to charity organisations. In April 2018 his club Rhein-Neckar Löwen announced that next season Kim Ekdahl du Rietz will transfer to Paris Saint-Germain Handball. At the same time he also made a comeback to the Swedish national team, and participated in both 2019 World Championship and 2020 European Championship.

In 2020 he announced once again that he's retiring, both from the Swedish national team, and his club team at the time; Paris Saint-Germain Handball.

May 21, 2021, after one of his previous club teams Rhein-Neckar Löwen has had a lot of injuries, it is announced that Ekdahl Du Rietz will join the team for the two last games in the EHF European League finals, that are being played May 22nd & 23rd.

References

External links

1989 births
Living people
Sportspeople from Lund
Swedish male handball players
Olympic handball players of Sweden
Handball players at the 2012 Summer Olympics
Olympic silver medalists for Sweden
Olympic medalists in handball
Medalists at the 2012 Summer Olympics
Lugi HF players
Expatriate handball players
Rhein-Neckar Löwen players
Swedish expatriate sportspeople in France
Swedish expatriate sportspeople in Germany
Handball-Bundesliga players